Gary Raymond Lawson (born 19 October 1965) is a New Zealand international lawn bowler and a record 14 times New Zealand champion.

Bowls career

World Championships
In 1996 he won the lawn bowls fours bronze medal at the 1996 World Outdoor Bowls Championship in Adelaide. He won a silver medal in the triples eight years later at the 2004 World Outdoor Bowls Championship. In 2008 he struck double gold winning both the pairs and fours at the 2008 World Outdoor Bowls Championship in Christchurch.

In 2020 he was selected for the 2020 World Outdoor Bowls Championship in Australia.

Commonwealth Games
Lawson has also appeared twice for New Zealand at the Commonwealth Games.

Asia Pacific
Lawson has won ten medals at the Asia Pacific Bowls Championships, a bronze in 1989, silver in 1993, double gold in 1995 in the pairs with Rowan Brassey and in the fours, a gold and silver in 2003, a gold in 2005, a silver in 2009 and his ninth and tenth medals was a pairs gold with Shannon McIlroy and a fours silver at the 2019 Asia Pacific Bowls Championships in the Gold Coast, Queensland.

National
He won a record 14 titles at the New Zealand National Bowls Championships bowling for the various bowls clubs. The wins were in the singles (1989, 1994); pairs (1997, 2008, 2010, 2016/17, 2017/18) and fours (1993, 1994. 1996, 1997, 2004, 2017/18, 2020).

References

External links
 

Living people
1965 births
New Zealand male bowls players
Bowls World Champions
Bowls players at the 2006 Commonwealth Games
Commonwealth Games competitors for New Zealand